Champernowne may refer to: 

 Arthur Champernowne (disambiguation), multiple people
 D. G. Champernowne (1912-2000), English economist and mathematician
 Champernowne constant, in mathematics
 Champernowne distribution, in statistics
 Joan Champernowne (died 1553), lady-in-waiting at the court of Henry VIII of England
 Katherine Champernowne, maiden name of Kat Ashley, governess and friend of Elizabeth I of England
 Clyst Champernowne, ancient name of Clyst St George, a village in East Devon, England

See also